Kovtun,  (Koltun), are gender-neutral surnames derived from the Slavic word for a formation of hair called Polish plait, as a nickname for a person with unkempt hair, "mophead".

People

Kovtun
 Anatolij Kovtun (1960–2005), Ukrainian basketball player
 Andriy Kovtun (born 1968), Ukrainian football player
 Dmitry Kovtun (1965-2022), Russian businessman and ex-KGB agent
 Illia Kovtun (born 2003), Ukrainian gymnast
 Marina Kovtun (born 1962), Russian politician
 Maxim Kovtun (born 1995), Russian figure skater
 Natalya Kovtun (born 1964), Russian sprinter
 Oleksiy Kovtun (born 1995), Ukrainian football defender
 Olena Kovtun (born 1966), Ukrainian table tennis player
 Yuri Kovtun (born 1970), Russian football defender

Koltun, Kołtun
 Daniel S. Koltun (1933–2014), American physicist
 Jarosław Kołtun, Polish racer
 Leonid Koltun (born 1944), Ukrainian football coach
 Mykhaylo Koltun (born 1949), Ukrainian bishop
 Sarah Koltun (born 1993), Canadian curler

See also
 L-vocalization, Dovhan
 
 

Ukrainian-language surnames
Polish-language surnames